Washington Square is one of the 22 squares of Savannah, Georgia, United States. It is located in the northernmost row of the city's five rows of squares, on Houston Street and East St. Julian Street. It is east of Warren Square and north of Greene Square in the northeastern corner of the city's grid of squares. The oldest building original to the square is 510 East St. Julian Street, which dates to 1797.

Built in 1790, Washington Square was named in 1791 for George Washington, the first president of the United States, who visited Savannah that year. It was one of only two squares named to honor a then-living person; Troup Square was the other.

Washington Square had been the site of the Trustees' Garden. Named for the trustees of General James Oglethorpe's colony, the garden was the testing ground for a variety of experimental crops – including mulberry (for silkworms), hemp, and indigo – viewed as potential cash crops. Most of these experiments proved unsuccessful.

The square was once the site of massive New Year's Eve bonfires; these were discontinued in the 1950s.

In 1964 Savannah Landscape Architect Clermont Huger Lee and Mills B. Lane planned and initiated a project to close the fire lane, add North Carolina bluestone pavers, initiate the use of different paving materials, install water cisterns, and lastly install new walks, benches, lighting, and plantings.

At 541–545 East Congress Street are three Joseph Burke Properties, built in 1860. They were restored in 1955 by preservationist Jim Williams (later the central character in John Berendt's 1994 book Midnight in the Garden of Good and Evil), his first project of over fifty he undertook before his death in 1990

Dedication

Constituent buildings

Each building below is in one of the eight blocks around the square composed of four residential "tything" blocks and four civic ("trust") blocks, now known as the Oglethorpe Plan. They are listed with construction years where known.

Northwestern tything/residential block
Mary Horrigan Property, 520–522 East Bryan Street (1899)
Joseph Wilkinson House, 11 Houston Street (1807)
Mary Gildea House, 514 East Bryan Street (1899)
Margaret Prindible Property, 508–512 East Bryan Street (1899)
William Williams House, 16 Price Street (1809)
D.D. Williams House, 12 Price Street (1816)
14 Price Street (1816)

Northwestern civic/trust block
Simon Mirault House, 21 Houston Street (1852) – moved from Troup Ward
Joachim Hartstene House, 23 Houston Street (c. 1803) – rebuilt with original members in 1964
516 East St. Julian Street (1849)
Daniel Philbrick House, 512–514 East St. Julian Street (1849)
510 East St. Julian Street (1797) – oldest building original to the square
Anne Pitman House, 504 East St. Julian Street (1842)

Southwestern civic/trust block
International Seaman's House, 25 Houston Street (1965)
Hampton Lillibridge House, 507 East St. Julian Street (1796–1799) – moved from 310 East Bryan Street
503 East St. Julian Street
William Flood House, 501 East St. Julian Street (1901)

Southwestern tything/residential block
Isabella Brower House, 519 East Congress Street (1837–1839)
Laurence Dunn Property (I), 31–33 Houston Street (1875)
Laurence Dunn Property (II), 35–37 Houston Street (1872)
William Gaston House, 511 East Congress Street (1839) – remodeled in 1869
Isabella Mallery House, 513 East Congress Street (1841)
William Wescott House, 36 Price Street (1875)
38 Price Street (c. 1840)

Northeastern tything/residential block
601 East Bay Street (1860) – now The Brice hotel

Northeastern civic/trust block
Morty Dorgan Property (I), 20 Houston Street (1852–1853)
Morty Dorgan Property (II), 542 East St. Julian Street (1853) – remodeled in 1888–1898

Southeastern civic/trust block
Catherine McCarthy Property, 26–30 Houston Street (1887)
545–547 East St. Julian Street (1887)
Mary Ferguson House, 549 East St. Julian Street (1905)
31 East Broad Street (1860)
33–35 East Broad Street (1860)

Southeastern tything/residential block
537–539 East Congress Street (1915)
Joseph Burke Properties, 541–545 East Congress Street (1860)
Ann Pinder House, 547 East Congress Street (1831–1835)
James McMahon House, 37–39 East Broad Street (1874)
Charles Wood Row House, 41–47 East Broad Street (1899)

Gallery

References

Washington Square, Savannah
1790 establishments in Georgia (U.S. state)